Mokrousovo is a rural locality (a village) in Ufa, Bashkortostan, Russia. Its population was 228 as of 2010. It has four streets.

Geography 
Mokrousovo is located 21 km south of Ufa. Urshak is the nearest rural locality.

References 

Rural localities in Ufa urban okrug